Zheng He Xia Xiyang is a 2009 Chinese television series based on the voyages of Zheng He, the explorer who led seven expeditions to Southeast Asia, South Asia and East Africa in the 15th century.

Cast

Gallen Lo as Zheng He
Tang Guoqiang as the Yongle Emperor
Yu Xiaohui as Empress Xu
Du Yulu as Yao Guangxiao
Theresa Lee as Shana'er
Yu Xiaoxue as Song Lianxin
Sun Qiang as Wu Xuan
Yan Hongzhi as Zhang Yu
Li Daguang as Wang Jinghong
Bai Yujuan as Xu Miaojin
Dong Ziwu as Nan Xuangong
Jiang Changyi as Xie Jin
Hou Xiangling as Chen Zuyi
Zhang Jie as Zhu Gaochi
Xie Zhenwei as Zhu Zhanji
Li Qi as Zhu Quan
Zhang Hao as Xia Yuanji
Yang Fan as Zhu Gaoxu
Qian Xueming as Fang Xiaoru
Lü Yiding as Shi Jinqing
Ma Jun as Tie Ping
Zhang Yushan as Qi Tai
Liu Haitao as Zhu Neng
Lan Danuo as the Jianwen Emperor
Jia Wei as Qiu Fu
Dong Danjun as Qiu Guangde
Gang Limin as Hu Cheng
Lin Jian as Song Tian
Ma Tingjun as Liu Ruming
Chen Weirong as King Yaliekunai'er
Du Jian as Prince Mana of Brunei

Production
The series was specially produced to mark the 600th anniversary of Zheng He's voyages. Shooting for the series started on 30 September 2005 in Hengdian World Studios, Zhejiang.

International Broadcasts

External links
Zheng He Xia Xiyang on Sina.com 

2009 Chinese television series debuts
Chinese historical television series
Cultural depictions of Zheng He
Television shows written by Zhu Sujin
Television series set in the 15th century
Television series set in the Ming dynasty
Treasure voyages
Cultural depictions of explorers